A list of films produced by the Marathi language film industry based in Maharashtra in the year 1942.

1942 Releases
A list of Marathi films released in 1942.

References

External links
Gomolo - 

Lists of 1942 films by country or language
1942
1942 in Indian cinema